The Sound and the Fury is a 1959 American drama film directed by Martin Ritt. It is loosely based on the 1929 novel of the same name by William Faulkner.

Plot 
Quentin Compson is a girl of 17 in the small Mississippi town of Jefferson. She lives with her step-uncle, Jason, who has practically raised Quentin ever since her promiscuous mother, Caddy, abandoned her.

Jason makes ends meet working in the store of Earl Snopes, a man he detests. He is the provider for several people in the large family house, including Howard, who is Quentin's uncle, and his step-brother, and a mute, mentally handicapped man named Benjy, his other step-brother. Other occupants include Jason's bitter, resentful mother; Dilsey, a black housekeeper, and Luster, Dilsey's grandson who looks after Benjy.

Quentin is bored, restless, and not interested in Jason's wishes that she continue her education. When a carnival comes to town, she becomes infatuated with Charlie Busch, a carny worker who tries to seduce her.

Caddy returns to town. She has a tentative reunion with Quentin, but takes Jason's side because she has no money and needs him to shelter her now. Caddy flirts with Snopes, who implies that they had intimate relations and is beaten by Jason for saying as much. Benjy becomes incensed when he catches Quentin sneaking out to meet Busch and tries to strangle her, whereupon Jason decides that Benjy must be committed to an institution.

A frustrated Quentin wants to leave with Busch and claims she can get her hands on $3,000. She steals it from a suitcase of money Jason had been saving for her future. To prove the stranger's true intentions, Jason goes to Busch and gives him a choice: the girl or the money. Quentin is crushed when she realizes what Busch is really after. She returns to Jason and promises to be more mature in their future together.

Cast

Production
In September 1955 the novel was optioned by Jerry Wald who had a deal at Columbia. The previous month Wald optioned the Faulkner story, Soldier's Pay. In August 1956 Wald announced he had purchased the screen rights and would make it for 20th Century Fox, and that the team of Harriet Frank and Irvin Ravitch would do the adaptation. Wald had a tendency to film older novels; he said he took advice from a survey of librarians throughout the country to see what older books were "perennial favorites" with readers. Wald offered the leading roles of Jason and Candace to Laurence Olivier and Vivien Leigh.

In January 1957 Gregory Peck signed to star with filming to begin in June. Audrey Hepburn was sought to co star and Jose Quintero to direct. Quintero turned down the film, By May 1957 Martin Ritt was signed to direct and Wald was going to make another Faulkner tale as well, The Hamlet, which became The Long Hot Summer. Ritt did it under a two-picture contract with Fox.

Eventually Ritt filmed Long Hot Summer first.

In December 1957 filming was postponed due to difficulties in casting. Lana Turner was to star as Caddy.

In January 1958 Yul Brynner signed to star.

Reception 
Bosley Crowther of The New York Times wrote that the film "lacks texture" and is "sentiment-dappled and synthetic". The negative reception may also have been partly due to Joanne Woodward's being so much older than the character she played; at almost 30 years old, it was hard to find her believable as a 17-year-old girl.

See also
List of American films of 1959

References

External links

1950s American films
1950s English-language films
1959 films
1959 drama films
20th Century Fox films
American drama films
CinemaScope films
Fictional couples
Films based on American novels
Films based on works by William Faulkner
Films directed by Martin Ritt
Films produced by Jerry Wald
Films scored by Alex North
Films set in Mississippi
Southern Gothic films